Trustpuram is a residential area in Kodambakkam, in the city of Chennai, India.

References 

Neighbourhoods in Chennai